Hyvinkää is a city and municipality of Finland. The city was chartered in 1960. Its neighboring municipalities are Riihimäki and Hausjärvi in the north, Mäntsälä in the east, Tuusula and Nurmijärvi in the south, and Vihti and Loppi in the west.

Highways (such as Tampere Highway (E12) and Hanko Highway) and rail connections make it one of the suburban commuter centers of Greater Helsinki. The city planning has had an emphasis on recreational facilities.

Some of the more well-known buildings in Hyvinkää are, among others, the Church (1961, Aarno Ruusuvuori) of Hyvinkää and the manor house of Kytäjä. The Finnish Railway Museum is located in Hyvinkää.

Hyvinkää is also home to Konecranes, which specializes in the manufacture and service of cranes, and KONE Elevators, the world's third-largest elevator company who manufacture, install and service elevators and escalators.

The workshop of Ruokangas Guitars, the leading Finnish electric guitar maker, was located at Wanha Villatehdas, Hyvinkää until 2011.

Hyvinkää is known among Scandinavian golf enthusiasts due to Kytäjä Golf, located in the village of Kytäjä located in the countryside of Hyvinkää. It offers two courses designed by Tom McBroom: South East Course opened in August 2003, and North West Course in August 2004.

History

In the 16th century there was a tavern in the area now known as Hyvinkäänkylä (literally "the village of Hyvinkää"), which lies approximately halfway between Helsinki and Hämeenlinna. It was mentioned the first time in 1495 as Höffinga. The first tax catalogues also marked the existence of some houses in the area around the same time. During the 16th century there was also a mine close to current-day Kytäjä village.

Hyvinkää village gradually grew in the latter half of the 19th century, though it was the construction of the railway network through Finland, beginning in 1861, that marked the starting point for the town's rapid growth. Hyvinkää, who still belonged to the Nurmijärvi parish at that time, resigned in 1917 as its own parishioner.

The construction of Finland's first stretch of railroad, the Helsinki–Hämeenlinna line, determined the location of the present city centre and the railway station of Hyvinkää is one of the few original stations still in use. From Hyvinkää the railway also branches off to the port of Hanko. The Hanko–Hyvinkää Railroad was the first private railroad in Finland, founded in 1862, and acquired by the Finnish State RR Co. in 1875. In the early 20th century, the station village in Hyvinkää was an intermediate stopping point for many emigrants leaving by ship from Hanko for a new life in North America.

The air quality of Hyvinkää was considered healthy due to dense pine forests, and in the 1880s a group of physicians from Helsinki opened a sanatorium for patients seeking rest and recuperation.

Industrialization brought a wool factory to Hyvinkää in 1892 – the Donner family's Hyvinge Yllespinneri. The factory ceased operation in the 1990s, but the red-brick halls still remain. The building has found several new uses, including an exhibition centre and a theater.

Hyvinkää Airfield served as the country's main airport for a short time after the second World War while Helsinki-Malmi Airport was under the control of the Allied Powers. There is now a motorsports centre near the airfield.

Hyvinkää's population grew quickly following the Second World War. It became home to many Finnish Karelian refugees after Karelia was handed out to Soviet Union by the Moscow Peace Treaty. Nowadays Hyvinkää is the sixth biggest town by inhabitants of Uusimaa.

Politics
Results of the 2011 Finnish parliamentary election in Hyvinkää:

National Coalition Party 25.1%
Social Democratic Party 23.9%
True Finns 22.4%
Green League 8.1%
Left Alliance 7.6%
Centre Party 7.5%
Christian Democrats 2.9%
Swedish People's Party 0.8%

Public services

Health care 
There are three health care centers in Hyvinkää. Hyvinkää hospital is one of largest general hospitals in Finland. The emergency unit services 24 hours in day.

Education 

There are twenty primary schools in Hyvinkää: Anttila school (grades 1–2), Asema school (and the English classes of Hyvinkää), Hakala school, Hyvinkäänkylä school, Hämeenkatu school, Härkävehmas school (grades 3–9), Kaukas school, Kytäjä school, Martti school, Noppo school, Paavola school, Pohjoispuisto school (grades 7–9), Puolimatka school (grades 1–9), Ridasjärvi school, Svenska skolan i Hyvinge (Grades 1–6), Talvisilta school (Grades 1–2), Tapainlinna school (Grades 1–9), Uusikylä school and Vehkoja school (grades 3–9).

There are two high schools in Hyvinkää; Hyvinkään yhteiskoulun lukio and Sveitsin lukio.

Transportation

Railway 

Hyvinkää is an important railway city, located on the primary rail route in southern Finland. Station building is one of the original Helsinki-Hämeenlinna railway stations in original use. The city is also home to the Finnish Railway Museum and a VR maintenance area. Hyvinkää also has another railway line, the Hyvinkää-Karis railway towards Hanko (founded on 8 October 1873). Passenger traffic between Hyvinkää and Karis ended in September 1983, but the railway is still in use by VR Cargo.

Airfield 

Hyvinkää airfield was the main airport of Finland in 1944–1947, when Helsinki-Malmi Airport was in use by the Allied Commission. Finnair used Hyvinkää as a major hub. Finnair's DC-3-pilots trained to fly at Hyvinkää airfield in 1948.

Since the 1950s, the airfield has mainly been in use by general aviation. Aviation clubs including Jukolan Pilotit, Mäntsälän Ilmailukerho and Hyvinkään Ilmailukerho operate from the airfield as of 2020.

Buses 

The Local bus service is operated by Hyvinkään Liikenne. There are six local bus lines.

Sports

Hyvinkää has a large variety of sports. Hyvinkään Tahko plays pesäpallo at men's top league, Superpesis. Hyvinkää Falcons plays american football in nation's second level in both men's and women's league system. Hyvinkään Palloseura or HyPS plays association football in the fourth division in men's and in the fifth division in women's football. Hyvinkää has three men's ice hockey teams of which Hoki Klupi Hyvinkää plays in the fourth division and Hyvinkää Bruins and Hyvinkää Storm in the fifth division. In basketball Hyvinkään Ponteva plays in men's first division and in women's top league.

Festivals

In the Summer, there is an annual beer festival which attracts rock bands from Scandinavia and about 10,000 visitors.

Notable residents

Tomi Kalliola, musician
Niko Kari, racing driver
Jaan Markus Keski-Kastari, California champion wake boarder, MX-3 racer, Olympic candidate snowboarder
Aki Klemm, musician, composer, artist
Sauli Koskinen, TV presenter living in Los Angeles
Heikki Mikkola, motocross racer; four-time world champion
Peetu Piiroinen, Olympic silver medallist, men's halfpipe
Katri Rosendahl, endurance riding national champion 2007
Juha Ruokangas, master luthier, founder of Ruokangas Guitars
Jalmari Ruokokoski, painter
Esa Saarinen, philosopher
Yrjö Saarinen, painter
Tyko Sallinen, painter
Ossi Savolainen, mayor of Hyvinkää
Helene Schjerfbeck, painter
Roni Tran Binh Trong, singer
Lauri Tukonen, professional ice hockey player
Markku Uusipaavalniemi, curler, politician
Sanna Valkonen, professional football player
Petteri Wirtanen, professional ice hockey player

International relations

Twin towns – Sister cities
Hyvinkää is twinned with:

 Eigersund, Norway
 Kecskemét, Hungary
 Kostroma, Russia
 Motala, Sweden
 Hersfeld-Rotenburg district, Germany
 Kunshan, China

Projects

The educational department takes part in Lifelong Learning Programme 2007–2013 in Finland.

See also
 Battle of Hyvinkää
 Finnish national road 25
 Hanko–Hyvinkää railway
 Hausjärvi
 Hyvinkää shooting
 Hyvinkäänkylä
 Jarno Elg
 Kytäjä
 Nurmijärvi
 Riihimäki

References

External links

Town of Hyvinkää – Official website
Finnish Railway Museum
Steam Locomotives in Finland Including the Finnish Railway Museum
Hyrinet – Hyvinkää–Riihimäki area portal
Pictures from Hyvinkää

 
Greater Helsinki
Cities and towns in Finland
Populated places established in 1917
1917 establishments in Finland